Jamiri (real name Jan-Michael Richter, born 3 May 1966 in Hattingen-Blankenstein, Germany) is one of the most recognized comics artists in Germany.

Jamiri has published nine comic collections since 1990. He has published one- and two-page comics in German magazines since 1992. Today, he has more than one million readers monthly.

Biography
Jan-Michael Richter attended the Waldorf school in Bochum from 1972 until 1985. In 1985 he attended the Ruhr-University of Bochum where he began studying comparative literature and philosophy. He then switched in 1986 to a design major at the comprehensive university in Essen. 

Jan-Michael Richter has lived in Essen since 1986. He married Beate Kleinschmidt in 2000. She often appeared as a character in his comics.  The couple separated in October 2014 after 25 years relationship. He is also the cousin of the international soccer player Mehmet Scholl.

Publicity and Distribution
Jan-Michael Richter has drawn comics since childhood. In 1990 he began to draw professionally.  In 1992, he became a regular comic artist for the Ruhr city magazine, Marabo. He has since published comics in other magazines. Through his strong association with the large German university magazine, Unicum, he has accompanied four generations of students through their studies; the German student populace is well-acquainted with him. In 2003, Jamiri became a regular artist for the Spiegel Online, one of the largest and most acclaimed online magazines in Germany. Altogether, it is estimated that Jamiri has over a million monthly readers.

Jamiri also publishes comic collections in a classical format (DIN A4 with 48 pages). Since 1994 he has published eight such collections. Although these collections are only available in German currently, translations are underway.

Works

Comic collections
Bochum lokal (1990, Bospekt-Verlag, Bochum, Germany)
Carpe Noctem (1994, Unicum Edition, Bochum, Germany; republished 2002, Carlsen-Verlag, Hamburg, Germany)
Bohème 29 (1995, Unicum Edition, Bochum, Germany; republished 2002, Carlsen-Verlag, Hamburg, Germany)
Homepages (1997, Unicum Edition, Bochum, Germany; republished 2002, Carlsen-Verlag, Hamburg, Germany)
Kamikaze d'amour (1999, Eichborn-Verlag, Frankfurt am Main, Germany).
Dotcom Dummy (2000, Unicum Edition, Bochum, Germany; republished 2002, Carlsen-Verlag, Hamburg, Germany)
Hypercyber (2002, Carlsen-Verlag, Hamburg, Germany)
Richterskala (2004, Carlsen-Verlag, Hamburg, Germany)
Pornorama (2005, Uni-Edition, Berlin, Germany)
Autodox (2007, Uni-Edition, Berlin, Germany)

Contributions to compilations
Association of authors: Cartoon 2000 (1999, Achterbahn-Verlag, Kiel, Germany)
Marcel Feige: Das Große Comic-Lexikon (2001, Schwarzkopf & Schwarzkopf, Berlin, Germany)
Winfried Ulrich: Didaktik der deutschen Sprache (2001, Klett-Verlag, Stuttgart, Germany)

Continuous comics artist of periodicals
Marabo (1992 until 2004)
Unicum (since 1993)
Online Today (1996 until 2002)
AOL-Magazin (1999 until 2003)
Mitteilungen des deutschen Mathematiker-Verbandes (MDMV) (since 2002)
Spiegel Online (since 2003)
[Wirtschaftsmagazin Ruhr] (since 2004)

Single contributions in periodicals
030, Airbrush Art+Action, Berliner Zeitung, Coolibri, Designers Digest, Digital Arts, Hamburger Morgenpost, Häuptling Eigener Herd, Info 3, Magic Attack, Neue Ruhr Zeitung, Petra, Prinz, Ran, TAZ, WDR Online, Westdeutsche Allgemeine Zeitung, Wieselflink

References

External links
 (German)

German comics artists
German graphic designers
German illustrators
Waldorf school alumni
Living people
Artists from Essen
People from Bochum
Ruhr University Bochum alumni
1966 births